Turton Urban District was, from 1873 to 1974, a local government district centred on the historical area of Turton in the administrative county of Lancashire, England.

History

Background

Turton was a township and chapelry of the civil and ecclesiastical parish of Bolton le Moors in the Salford Hundred of Lancashire. In 1837, Turton became part of the Bolton Poor Law Union which took responsibility for funding the Poor Law within that Union area. In 1866, Turton was given the status of a civil parish.

Formation
A resolution for the adoption of the Local Government Act 1858 was passed on 8 August 1872 by the owners and ratepayers of the township of Turton, and the following year a local board was formed to govern the area. After the Public Health Act 1875 was passed by Parliament in that year, Turton Local Board assumed extra duties as an urban sanitary district, although the Local Board's title did not change.

Change
In 1895, following the implementation of the Local Government Act 1894, Turton Local Board was reconstituted as an elected urban district council of twenty-one members. Four years later, under the Bolton, Turton and Westhoughton Extension Act 1898, Turton Urban District was greatly enlarged by the addition of the civil parishes of Belmont, Bradshaw, Harwood, Longworth, Entwistle, Edgworth and Quarlton from the former Bolton Rural District, which almost doubled the Urban District's population. The Urban District Council had seven electoral wards: Chapeltown, Bromley Cross, Eagley, Egerton, Bradshaw, Edgworth, and Belmont wards, each represented by three councillors. Following the death of Sir Lees Knowles, 1st Baronet, in 1929, his widow, Lady Nina Knowles, presented Turton Tower to the Urban District Council in 1930, which became the council's seat of local government. Between 1961 and 1971, Bradshaw ward was divided into Bradshaw North and Bradshaw South.

Abolition
Under the Local Government Act 1972, Turton Urban District was abolished on 1 April 1974 and its former area was divided between two local authorities. The larger rural area, North Turton, became a civil parish of the Borough of Blackburn in Lancashire. The smaller urban area, South Turton, became an unparished area of the Metropolitan Borough of Bolton in Greater Manchester.

Demography

Lists of office holders

Chairmen of Turton Local Board

Chairmen of Turton Urban District Council

Notes

Districts of England abolished by the Local Government Act 1972
Districts of England created by the Local Government Act 1894
History of Lancashire
Local Government Districts created by the Local Government Act 1858
Local government in Blackburn with Darwen
Local government in the Metropolitan Borough of Bolton
Urban districts of England